The Office of the Chief of Staff of the Governor of Puerto Rico (Spanish: Secretaría de la Gobernación de Puerto Rico) is the umbrella organization and government agency of the executive branch of the government of Puerto Rico that manages and oversees all the executive departments of the government of Puerto Rico and almost all executive agencies. The Office is headed by the Puerto Rico Chief of Staff and is composed by the Governor's Advisory Board and all other staff appointed by the chief of staff. The Office of the Chief of Staff  is ascribed to the Office of the Governor.

Duties and responsibilities
The duties and responsibilities of the Office vary greatly from one administration to another, and in fact, there is no legal requirement that the Governor even continues or creates it. Nevertheless, one of the first acts undertaken by a new Governor once he is sworn in is to issue an executive order proclaiming the continuation of the agency, albeit with different members. This order also establishes the agency's duties and responsibilities as the Governor sees fit. This proclamation is done in virtue of the executive powers vested upon the Governor by Law No. 104 of 1956 which include the faculty to delegate functions.

Agencies overseen

Both the Constitution of Puerto Rico and Puerto Rican law usually ascribe all executive offices to either the Governor or the Office of the Governor. The Governor then issues an executive order proclaiming the delegation of the management and overwatch of such executive offices onto the Office of the Chieff of Staff. This proclamation is done in virtue of the executive powers vested upon the Governor by Law No. 104 of 1956 which include the faculty to delegate functions.

The agencies overseen by the Chief of Staff include all the executive departments of the government of Puerto Rico and almost all executive offices created either through an executive order or by law. The Office of Management and Budget and the Planning Board are the only executives offices not ascribed to the Chief of Staff —both report directly to the Office of the Governor of Puerto Rico.

The agencies overseen by the Chief of Staff include the following:

 Commission on Cooperative Development
 Commission on Safety and Public Protection
 Department of Agriculture
 Department of Consumer Affairs
 Department of Corrections and Rehabilitation
 Department of Economic Development and Commerce
 Department of Education
 Department of Family Affairs
 Department of Health
 Department of Housing
 Department of Justice
 Department of Labor and Human Resources
 Department of Natural and Environmental Resources
 Department of Sports and Recreation
 Department of State
 Department of Transportation and Public Works
 Department of Treasury
 Economic Development Bank
 Federal Affairs Administration
 Financing of Housing Authority
 Financing of Industrial, Touristic, Educative, Medical, and Environmental Control Facilities Authority (AFICA)
 Financing of Puerto Rico Infrastructure Authority
 Government Development Bank
 Municipal Financing Agency
 Public Financing Corporation
 Public-Private Partnerships Authority
 Urgent Interest Fund Corporation (COFINA)

References
 
 
 Law No. 104 of 1956
 Government of Puerto Rico Organigram

Office of the Governor of Puerto Rico